Tiwaripur is the name of several villages in India:

Tiwaripur, Jaunpur, Kerakat tehsil, Jaunpur district, Uttar Pradesh
Tiwaripur, Mirzapur, Mirzapur district, Uttar Pradesh